The Solicitor-General of Fiji is the Chief Executive Officer of the Attorney-General's Chambers, and as such assists the Attorney-General in advising the government on legal matters, and in performing legal work for the government. The previous Solicitor-General was Christopher Pryde, who took office in July 2007 until he was appointed Director of Public Prosecutions in 2011. The Office is currently vacant, although Deputy Solicitor-General Sharvada Sharma has been acting in the position to date.

Unlike the Attorney-General, who holds political office as a member of the House of Representatives or Senate, the Solicitor-General is a civil servant.  He is required by the Constitution to hold a law degree and to be a registered lawyer.

List of Solicitors-General of Fiji 

The following persons have held the office of Solicitor-General since it was established in 1945.

References

External links 
 Solicitors-General (official website)

Solicitor-General
Government of Fiji
Fiji